Lasionycta leucocycla is a moth of the family Noctuidae. It can be found in Scandinavia, Siberia and northern North America.

The wingspan is 22–28 mm. The moths fly from June to July.

Adults feed on the nectar of Silene acaulis, Mertensia paniculata and Senecio species, probably Senecio lugens.

The larvae feed on Dryas octopetala and Astragalus species.

Subspecies
Lasionycta leucocycla dovrensis (northern Europe)
Lasionycta leucocycla altaica (Altai)
Lasionycta leucocycla leucocycla (arctic North America from Greenland and Ellesmere Island west to northern Yukon)
Lasionycta leucocycla moeschleri (eastern Canada from the east coast of Hudson Bay and southern Labrador north to the arctic islands near the Ungava Peninsula, Quebec)
Lasionycta leucocycla hampa (White Mountains of New Hampshire)
Lasionycta leucocycla albertensis (west-central Alaska and central Yukon southward in the Rocky Mountains to the Beartooth Plateau on the Montana-Wyoming border and the Russian Far East)
Lasionycta leucocycla magadanensis (Eurasia)

Lasionycta leucocycla dovrensis is formally treated as a subspecies of Lasionycta leucocycla, but might be a valid species, in which case Lasionycta leucocycla altaica would probably be a subspecies of Lasionycta dovrensis.

Former subspecies
Lasionycta leucocycla kenteana (Kentei)
Lasionycta leucocycla mongolica (Uliassutai)
Lasionycta leucocycla subfumosa (Northwest Territories)

Lasionycta leucocycla flanda was raised to species level as Lasionycta flanda.

External links
A Revision of Lasionycta Aurivillius (Lepidoptera, Noctuidae) for North America and notes on Eurasian species, with descriptions of 17 new species, 6 new subspecies, a new genus, and two new species of Tricholita Grote

Lasionycta
Moths of North America
Moths of Europe
Insects of the Arctic
Moths described in 1857